St John's Church is a 13th-century church on the corner of Grainger Street and Westgate Road in Newcastle upon Tyne, England, dedicated to St John the Baptist. It is a Grade I listed building.

History and Building Description
The old church of St. John is believed to date from c.1287. William Gray called it "a pretty little church, commended by an arch-prelate of this kingdom because it resembled much a cross". The quiet simplicity of the church contrasts with the modern buildings which surround and overtop it on three sides. Its tower is low and square, with small pinnacles at the corners. Its windows have flattened arched tops, far from elegant in design. It is perhaps reminiscent of some little church in a rural aspect, standing as it does amongst trees in its quiet graveyard, amongst all the turmoil and bustle of the busy streets which run past it.

Over the outside of the large window in the south transept, which looks into Westgate Street, is a stone to commemorate the generosity of Robert Rhodes and which has his arms carved upon it. He was the builder of the steeple of St. Nicholas’ Cathedral in Newcastle, and the benefactor of this and all the churches of the town. The current stone is a copy of the original, which was placed there in Rhode's life, as were also his arms in the groining of the tower. The original was taken down c.1861 during repairs, and is now in the castle.

Interior
The 15th-century font cover and the Jacobean pulpit are fine examples of local woodwork. When the church was restored, a new sanctuary was created at the Crossing, which contains a stone altar slab given in 1712 as a reminder of the church revival under Queen Anne. The chancel, now the Lady Chapel, contains a window including the fragments of medieval glass with the earliest known representation of the arms of Newcastle. Further along the wall is a cruciform opening which enabled the anchorite, whose cell was above the present sacristy, to see the altar. The rood and reredos are both the work of Sir Charles Nicholson.

Graveyard

Part of the graveyard was built over in the 1960s for meeting rooms and a hall.  Since then, most of the rest has also been paved over. As of 2010, there remained about ten gravestones. Two of these, that to Solomon Hodgson, owner of the Newcastle Chronicle and that to the artist Ralph Waters are listed grade II.

Irish actor and poet John Cunningham is buried in the graveyard. Not far from the east window lies a stone slab, part of a table monument, its four supporting pillars lying half buried in the soil beneath it. This is one of the most interesting monuments in the city. The inscription on it reads as follows:

See also
 St John the Baptist’s Church web site
 Photographs here

References

John the Baptist
Grade I listed churches in Tyne and Wear
Church of England church buildings in Tyne and Wear
12th-century church buildings in England